Operation Herkules was the German code-name given to an abortive plan for the invasion of Malta during the  Second World War. Through air and sea landings, the Italians and Germans hoped to eliminate Malta as a British air and naval base and secure an uninterrupted flow of supplies across the Mediterranean Sea to Axis forces in Libya and Egypt.

Extensive preparations were made for the invasion but the success of other Axis operations – including the Battle of Gazala (26 May to 21 June 1942), the Axis capture of Tobruk on 21 June and Operation Aïda, the pursuit of the Allies into Egypt – led to Herkules being postponed and then cancelled in November 1942.

Origins
The Axis plan to invade Malta had its origin in Italian military studies conducted during the Second Italo-Abyssinian War in the mid-1930s. By 1938, Comando Supremo, the Italian army general staff, had estimated the amount of sea transport it would require to move military forces into North Africa, and identified the seizure of Malta as a prerequisite. An outline plan for a seaborne assault was drawn up and periodically revised; the Regia Marina initially showed little interest in it. The concept of an invasion was approved at a meeting between Adolf Hitler and Benito Mussolini from 29 to 30 April 1942.

Axis plans and preparations

Airborne forces

Command of the airborne component of Herkules was given to Generalmajor Kurt Student and Fliegerkorps XI. Student had commanded the German airborne assault in the Battle of Crete in May 1941. This time, Student had months to prepare and learn from the mistakes made on Crete. Knowledge of British defensive positions on Malta was extensive, thanks to meticulous aerial mapping by the Italians. Every fortification, artillery emplacement and AA battery was carefully scrutinised. Student claimed later that "We even knew the calibre of the coastal guns, and how many degrees they could be turned inland". Ten Gruppen of Junkers Ju 52 transports, with 500 aircraft, were allocated for the air landings, along with 300 DFS 230 gliders (carrying ten men each) and 200 larger Go 242 gliders (each carrying twenty-three men or a light vehicle/gun). Also to be included were two dozen Messerschmitt Me 321 Gigant gliders capable of carrying up to 200 fully equipped paratroopers or a  tank. These were to be towed by new He 111Z (Zwilling) five-engined versions of the He 111 medium bomber.

The Regia Aeronautica would contribute 180 to 220 transport aircraft, mostly three-engined SM.75s (carrying 24–28 men each), SM.81s (12–14 men each) and SM.82s (30–34 men each). Given the  distance between Axis airfields on Sicily and the drop zones over Malta, it was possible for the motorised transports to make four round-trips per day. The aircraft were to drop one Italian and one German airborne division onto the southern side of the island. The paratroopers had to secure the high ground behind the invasion beaches and seize a nearby airfield for Axis transport aircraft to land another division and supplies. Airborne units for the invasion included the German Fliegerdivision 7 (11,000 men) plus the Italian Paratroopers Division (7,500 men) and the airlanding 80th Infantry Division "La Spezia" (10,500 men) approximately 29,000 airborne troops.

Amphibious forces

The seaborne assault force comprised 70,000 Italian troops who were to make amphibious landings at two points on the south-eastern side of the island, in Marsaxlokk bay, the main effort falling upon a site named "Famagosta beach" and a smaller secondary landing at "Larnaca beach". Also to be seized were the lesser islands of Gozo and Comino. Amphibious feints would be directed at St. Paul's Bay, Mellieħa Bay and north-west of Valletta near the old Victoria Lines, to draw British attention away from the real landing sites. The main assault convoy was scheduled to begin landing on Malta just before midnight on the first day, after the airborne forces had landed in the afternoon and secured the heights above the beaches. The bulk of the first-wave assault troops would come from the 20th Infantry Division "Friuli" (10,000 men) and the 4th Infantry Division "Livorno" (9,850 men) of the Italian XXX Corps. Also included were 1,200 men from the 1st Assault Battalion and Loreto Battalion (both drawn from the Regia Aeronautica) two battalions of San Marco Marines (2,000 men) three battalions of Blackshirts (1,900 men General Santi Quasimodo) and 300 Nuotatori (a commando unit of San Marco marines specially trained in ocean swimming and beach assault). Armoured support comprised nineteen Semovente 47/32 and eight Semovente 75/18 self-propelled guns plus thirty L3 tankettes (comparable in size and armament to the British Bren Gun Carrier).

The follow-up convoy would be mainly made up of troops from the Italian XVI Corps: the 26th Infantry Division "Assietta" (9,000 men), the 54th Infantry Division "Napoli" (8,900 men), artillery units (3,200 men) and the remainder of the 10th Armoured Regiment (3,800 men). The 1st Infantry Division "Superga" (9,200 men) plus a battalion of Blackshirts and 1,000 San Marco Marines were to be in position to land on the smaller island of Gozo in the early hours of the second day. Additional armour intended for Herkules included 2.Kompanie/Panzerabteilung z.b.V.66 (zur besonderen Verwendung [for special use]), a German unit partly equipped with captured Russian tanks. Ten assorted KV-1 [] and KV-2 [] heavy tanks were made available. At least ten Italian motozattere (landing craft) were modified with reinforced flooring and internal ramps to carry the Russian vehicles. Other tanks in the unit included captured Russian T-34 medium tanks, up-armoured German light tanks (five VK 1601s and five VK 1801s) plus twelve German Panzer IVGs armed with  guns. Twenty German Panzer III tanks were also offered for use in the invasion but it is not known what unit these were to be drawn from. The plans to use Russian captured tanks was at some point abandoned and the tanks used on Malta were to be Italian. Two days were allowed for the amphibious assault and landing of the follow-up convoy, though this was dependent on quickly securing Marsaxlokk Bay to land heavier artillery pieces and a much higher tonnage of supplies.

Landings

Lacking enough landing craft for an amphibious assault, the Regia Marina secured plans from the German Kriegsmarine to build copies of the Marinefährprahm Type A (MFP) in Italian shipyards. These  shallow-draught vessels, were capable of transporting up to 200 equipped infantry, 2–3 medium tanks, or an equivalent weight in cargo and could unload onto an open beach via a drop-down bow ramp. Sixty-five of these motozattere (MZs) were completed by July 1942 and about fifty were available for the invasion. Twenty German MFPs were transferred to the Mediterranean via the river Rhone to make up for an expected shortfall of Italian-built landing craft.

Some rafts were powered by outboard motors and others had to be rowed.

The Italians assembled a collection of other naval craft to transport the amphibious forces. These included two former Strait of Messina railway ferries (converted to carry four to eight tanks each); ten passenger ships (800–1,400 men each), six former passenger ferries (400 men each), six cargo ships (3,000 tons of supplies each), 30 ex-trawlers (300 men each); five converted minelayers (500 men each) and 74 assorted motorboats (30–75 men each). The Italians also requested the use of 200 additional German  to quickly transfer men from ship to shore. The Italian landing flotilla and the supporting ships formed the Special Naval Force ( Admiral Vittorio Tur).

It was formed from a series of joined modules that could be towed into place and act as a temporary jetty. Moored ships could then unload their cargo either directly onto the "roadway" or lower it down onto the  via their cranes. The  had been tested by the Army Training Unit at Le Havre in the fall of 1941 and was easily transportable by rail.

Naval escort
The Regia Marina had to protect the invasion convoys from attacks by the British Mediterranean Fleet and provide gunfire support during the landings. The force assigned to accomplish this included four battleships (Littorio, Vittorio Veneto, Duilio, and Andrea Doria), four heavy cruisers, eight light cruisers and 21 destroyers. These ships would assemble and sortie from the ports of Messina, Reggio Calabria, Augusta and Cagliari. The two older Andrea Doria-class battleships would carry approximately 200 rounds each for shore bombardment. Italian and German submarines were to scout for and intercept British naval forces attempting to interfere with the seaborne landings. One submarine was to be stationed midway between Sicily and Malta, to act as a guide beacon for the transport aircraft on their way to and from the drop zones.

The Italians were confident they could defeat any daylight incursions by the Mediterranean Fleet, especially given the Luftwaffe's ability to dominate the daytime skies, but there were concerns the Italian fleet would face serious difficulties if the British attacked at night. Lacking ship-borne radar and having neglected night-fighting training and equipment, the Regia Marina had been defeated at the Battle of Cape Matapan in March 1941. A similar encounter off Malta might wreak havoc on the slow-moving Axis invasion convoys, leaving the airborne forces cut off and imperilling Axis chances of taking the island.

The Regia Marina had made some efforts to rectify this situation by equipping the battleship Littorio with an experimental E.C.-3/bis Gufo (Owl) radar apparatus in August 1941, but the unit was considered unreliable (not until September 1942 did Littorio receive a standardised production-version Gufo with better performance; this set could detect surface ships at a range of }} and aircraft out to a range of ). In September 1941, while awaiting production of Italian-made radar units in quantity, the Regia Marina requested from the Kriegsmarine  a FuMO 24/40 G DeTe unit for the new destroyer, Legionario (under construction). By March 1942, the set had been delivered and installed and a small group of Italian ratings had been trained in Germany on its use. Operational testing began that spring and by May, the fleet commander Vice-Admiral Angelo Iachino had submitted a report praising its performance.

Maltese defences

In 1942 the garrison of Malta consisted of 15 infantry battalions (11 Commonwealth, 4 Maltese) organised into four brigades totalling 26,000 men. Tank support was provided by the 1st Independent Troop of the Royal Tank Regiment, disembarked in November 1940, which was initially equipped with four Matilda II Infantry Tanks, armed with 2-pounder (40 mm) guns, and two Vickers Mk.VIC light tanks, armed with two machine guns (part of detachments from the 7th Royal Tank Regiment and the 3rd The King's Own Hussars). These were reinforced in January 1942 by four Cruiser Mk I and three Cruiser Mk IV tanks and a Vickers Mk.VIC light tank, with the cruisers armed with 2-pounder (40 mm) guns (part of a detachment from the 6th Royal Tank Regiment).

Malta's fixed defences included nineteen heavy coastal guns (varying in size from 12-inch to 16-inch, although these Victorian era weapons were all decommissioned), 130 smaller coastal guns (6-pounder to 9.2-inch) and 112 heavy and 144 light anti-aircraft guns.

The smaller coastal guns comprised
[Data in this section taken from Hogg (2002)]
 10 × BL  Mk XXIV, on Mounting,  Mk 5 or 6
 7 × BL  gun Mk X, on Mounting Mk 7
 QF  gun Mk II, on Mounting Mk I
 18 × QF 6 pounder 10 cwt gun (9 × 2)
 ~30 × Ordnance QF 18 pounder

Aftermath
A date near mid-July 1942 was set for the invasion, partly to allow time to bring troops from other front line positions. Field Marshal Erwin Rommel supported the Malta plan and asked Hitler for command of the invasion forces. His reasons for supporting an invasion were to hinder the Allied troops fighting in Africa, as well as to remove the threat to the convoys heading to Italian-German forces with supplies, oil and men, all of which they lacked. He prioritised the attack to such an extent that he was willing to move units from his front for the attack. The head of the Luftwaffe, Hermann Göring, opposed the invasion, fearing it would turn into another near-disaster for his paratroops, as had happened in the Invasion of Crete. Generalfeldmarschall Albert Kesselring tirelessly promoted  but even he was eventually dissuaded when it became apparent that too many air and ground units had been siphoned off to support the Axis drive into Egypt, diminishing any chance of success. With Hitler lacking faith in the parachute divisions after Crete and in the ability of the Italian Navy to protect the invasion fleet from British naval attacks, the plan was cancelled.

References

Bibliography

Further reading
Books
 
 
 
 
 
 
 
 

Journals
 

Theses

External links 
 Merlins Over Malta
 Operations List (Malta)
 Beutepanzer
 British Order of Battle on Malta – in both 1939 and 1942

Mediterranean theatre of World War II
Cancelled military operations involving Germany
1942 in Europe
1942 in Malta
Cancelled invasions
Cancelled military operations of World War II
Invasions of Malta